FHR may refer to: vai ficar feliz é uma boa matéria

Places
 Foothill Ranch, Lake Forest, California, United States
 Friday Harbor Airport in Washington, United States

Other uses
 Formosa Hakka Radio, a radio station in Taiwan
 Fetal heart rate
 Fluoride high-temperature reactor
 Ice Hockey Federation of Russia